is a Japanese television jidaigeki or period drama that was broadcast in 1981 to 1982. It is the 17th in the Hissatsu series. The drama is a sequel to Hissatsu Shigotonin.

Cast
Makoto Fujita as Mondo Nakamura
Kunihiko Mitamura as Kazarishokunin no Hide
Kiyoshi Nakajō as Shamisenya no Yuji
Izumi Ayukawa as Nandemoya no Kayo
Isuzu Yamada as Oriku
Kin Sugai as Sen Nakamura
Mari Shiraki as Ritsu Nakamura
Fujio Suga as Uchiyama
Toshio Yamauchi as Chief Constable (Hittōdōshin) Kumagorō Tanaka

References

1981 Japanese television series debuts
1980s drama television series
Jidaigeki television series